New Boston is a census-designated place (CDP) comprising the main village in the town of New Boston, Hillsborough County, New Hampshire, United States. As of the 2020 census, the population of the CDP was 326, out of 6,108 in the entire town.

Geography
The CDP is in the center of the town of New Boston, on both sides of the South Branch Piscataquog River. The CDP extends west past Briar Hill Road, south down Route 13 to its crossing of the South Branch, east to Molly Stark Lane and Hilldale Lane, and north up Route 136 to Beard Road.

New Hampshire Route 13 passes through the center of the community, leaving to the northeast down the South Branch valley along River Road, and leaving to the south along Mont Vernon Road. Route 13 leads northeast  to Goffstown and south  to Milford. New Hampshire Route 136 has its eastern terminus at Route 13 and leads west  to Francestown, while New Hampshire Route 77 has it southern terminus at the same junction with NH 13 but leads north  to Weare.

Via the South Branch of the Piscataquog, New Boston is part of the Merrimack River watershed.

Demographics

References

Census-designated places in New Hampshire
Census-designated places in Hillsborough County, New Hampshire